This is a list of episodes from the second season of The Many Loves of Dobie Gillis; the series' on-screen title was shortened to Dobie Gillis starting with this season.

The first half of the season explores Dobie Gillis' life as a senior at Central High School. Over the course of episodes 18 through 22, Dobie and his best friend Maynard G. Krebs graduate and enlist in the US Army. The rest of the season primarily centers upon Dobie and Maynard's misadventures in basic training, with a handful of episodes featuring the characters back in their Central City hometown while on leave.

Broadcast history
The season originally aired Tuesdays at 8:30-9:00 pm (EST) on CBS from September 27, 1960 to June 27, 1961.

Nielsen ratings
The season ranked twenty-third  with a 23.0 rating.

DVD release
The Region 1 DVD of the entire series was released on July 2, 2013. A Season Two standalone set was released on January 14, 2014.

Cast

Main
 Dwayne Hickman as Dobie Gillis
 Frank Faylen as Herbert T. Gillis (28 episodes)
 Florida Friebus as Winifred "Winnie" Gillis (22 episodes)
 Bob Denver as Maynard G. Krebs

Recurring
 Sheila James as Zelda Gilroy (16 episodes)
 Steve Franken as Chatsworth Osborne, Jr. (11 episodes)
 William Schallert as Mr. Leander Pomfritt (10 episodes)
 Doris Packer as Mrs. Chatsworth Osbourne, Sr. (6 episodes)
 Marjorie Bennett as Mrs. Blossom Kenney (5 episodes)
 Tommy Farrell as Riff Ryan (2 episodes)

Episodes

References

External links
 

1960 American television seasons
1961 American television seasons
2